Dalian Jiaotong University is a university in Dalian, Liaoning, China. It is under the supervision of the provincial government and previously the Ministry of Railways. It has its main campus near downtown Dalian and a smaller campus in the Dalian Hi-tech Zone in Lüshunkou District. Until 2004, it was known as Dalian Railway Institute. Dalian Jiaotong University is the only university with a curriculum featuring rail transit in Northeast China.

References

External links
Official site (English)

Universities and colleges in Dalian
Ministry of Railways of China
Jiaotong University